The first season of The City premiered on December 29, 2008 and concluded on March 16, 2009. It followed Whitney Port's move to New York City after leaving Los Angeles as she followed her dream job. Instead of ordering a complete second season for The City MTV ordered 10 extra episodes to Season 1, which began on September 29, 2009 and completed on December 1, 2009.  On The Hills/The City Aftershow that night, Port confirmed the show was renewed for a second season. Part I was filmed from August 2008 to January 2009, while Part II was filmed from April to August 2009.

Synopsis
In Part 1, Whitney Port of 'The Hills' moves from her hometown of Los Angeles, California to  Manhattan. The first half follows her, best friend Erin, and boyfriend Jay while Port tackles her new job at global design house, Diane Von Furstenberg. Jays roommate, Adam, struggles in a relationship with his on/off girlfriend, Allie. Olivia, New York socialite, and Whitney's co-worker, deals with her cousin Nevan, who's living off of her for a while. Erin deals with an old boyfriend coming into her life, and Samantha "Sammy", is by her friends side through all the drama. Meanwhile, the fashion world takes them all by storm daily in the fierce streets of New York. In the second half of season 1, newly single Port goes back to working for Kelly Cutrone while her friend/former co-worker, Olivia Palermo, goes to work at ELLE Magazine. Whitney's old friend, Roxy, moves in with her and gets a job at People's Revolution, while Olivia has met her match, Erin K., at her new job. The second half focused more on the fashion world drama, instead of relationship drama. The road to Whitney's official launch of her clothing line "Whitney Eve" release was the main plot in this half of the season. The ratings increased in the second half with the premiere episode being viewed by 2 million people and the series was picked up for a full second season run in December 2009.

Cast
The following is a full list of cast members from the first season.

Season 1, Part 1
  Main Cast Member
  Secondary Cast Member

Mid-Season Changes
Instead of ordering a complete 2nd season for The City MTV ordered 10 extra episodes to Season 1. Therefore, the so-called Season 2, is in fact Season 1, Part 2. Whitney quit DVF and went back to work for Kelly Cutrone at People's Revolution. Jay is no longer a part of the series, now that his relationship with Whitney is officially over. Olivia left her job at DVF, for Elle Magazine. Erin got into a public fight with ex Duncan, and is single. Erin quit the series, as well as Jay. And according to Allie's official Twitter page, she stated that she and Adam haven't been filming, so she doubts that they were going to be on the new season. Since the three leads left the theme opening sequence was cut down to a few scenes of New York and a final shot of Whitney.

Season 1, Part 2
  Main Cast Member
  Secondary Cast Member

Episodes

References 

2008 American television seasons
2009 American television seasons